Ivanovka is a rural locality (a selo) and the administrative center of Kosikinsky Selsoviet of Yenotayevsky District, Astrakhan Oblast, Russia. The population was 563 as of 2010. There are 10 streets.

Geography 
Kosika is located 29 km southeast of Yenotayevka (the district's administrative centre) by road. Vostok is the nearest rural locality.

References 

Rural localities in Yenotayevsky District